An alchemist is a person who practices alchemy.

Alchemist or Alchemyst may also refer to:

Books and stories
 The Alchemist (novel), the translated title of a 1988 allegorical novel by Paulo Coelho
 The Alchemist (play), a play by Ben Jonson
 "The Alchemist" (short story), a 1908 short story by H. P. Lovecraft
 The Alchemist, a 2002 novel by Donna Boyd
 The Alchemist, a science fiction novelette by Charles L. Harness
 The Alchemists, a 1984 science fiction novel by Geary Gravel
 Fullmetal Alchemist, the English title of a series of Japanese manga and anime by Hiromu Arakawa
 The Neutronium Alchemist (1997), a book in The Night's Dawn Trilogy by Peter F. Hamilton
 The Alchemyst: The Secrets of the Immortal Nicholas Flamel, a 2007 fantasy novel by Michael Scott

Characters
 The Alchemist, a villain in Larryboy: The Cartoon Adventures, a spinoff of VeggieTales
 Element Lad, a comic superhero sometimes known by the codename "Alchemist"
 A recurring character on The Venture Bros.
 A character in Super Robot Monkey Team Hyperforce Go!

Art

Film, stage, and television
 The Alchemist (film), a 1986 horror film
 The Alchemist (play), a 17th-century play by Ben Jonson
 "The Alchemist" (The Blacklist), a 2014 episode from TV series The Blacklist

Music
 Alchemist (band), an Australian progressive metal band
 The Alchemist (musician), American record producer and DJ
 The Alchemist (Home album), a 1973 album by Home
 The Alchemist (Witchcraft album), a 2007 album by Swedish doom metal band Witchcraft
 The Alchemist (John Zorn album), the 2014 album by composer John Zorn
 The Alchemist (Handel), incidental music for a 1710 production of Ben Jonson's play
 Alchemist, a 2012 electronic album by Aleksander "Savant" Vinter
 "Alchemist", a song by Russell Watson on the 2004 album Amore Musica
 "The Alchemist", a song by Bruce Dickinson from his 1998 album The Chemical Wedding
 "The Alchemist", a song by Iron Maiden from the 2010 album, The Final Frontier
 "The Alchemist", a song by Blue Öyster Cult from their 2020 album The Symbol Remains

Other uses
 Alchemist (company), a Japanese video game developer
 Arc Alchemist series, Series of GPU by Intel
 Alchemist (video game), a 1983 ZX Spectrum game
 Alchemist Brewery, an American brewery
 , a British coaster
 A recurring job class in the Final Fantasy series
 Alchymist (Catephia alchymista), a moth

See also
 Johann der Alchimist (1406–1464), Margrave of Brandenburg
 List of alchemists
 List of chemists, includes some alchemists
 List of occultists, includes several alchemists